Giuseppe Barilli (20 April 1812 – 18 December 1894), also known under his pseudonym Quirico Filopanti, was an Italian mathematician and politician.

Biography
Barilli was born in Budrio, near Bologna, Italy, on 20 April 1812. He graduated in 1834 in mathematics and became professor of mechanics and hydraulics in 1848.

He was actively committed in the political affairs of the Italian unification movement and in 1849 took part in the establishment of the Roman Republic. He was appointed secretary of the Assemblea Costituente (constituent assembly) and was the author of the Decreto Fondamentale ("Fundamental Decree") which on 9 February 1849 declared the temporal government of the Pope as forfeited and proclaimed the Republic.

After the fall of the Republic he found shelter in the United States and afterwards in London, United Kingdom. Even after the formation of the Kingdom of Italy and his return to Italy, he had to leave his appointment as teacher of mechanics at the University of Bologna since he repeatedly refused to take his oath of allegiance to the monarchy. In 1876 he was elected as a member of the Parliament for the Republican Party. He died poor in Bologna in 1894.

In his work Miranda in 1858 he develops the idea of time zones. Filopanti's hypothesis was to ideally split up the earth into 24 areas (zones) along the lines of the meridians, each of which should have its own time. Each time zone should differ from the next by one hour, whereas minutes and seconds should coincide. The first time zone should be centred on Rome's meridian. The splitting into time zones should establish the local time (L). His hypothesis provided also with the establishing of a universal time (U) that should be used as only datum line in astronomy and telegraph communications.

Filopanti as paradoxer
Filopanti authored several books with peculiar titles, as Cesar at the Rubicon (1847), On the Uses of Canvas in Hydraulics (1866), God Exists (1881), God is a Liberal (1880), Synopsis of the Geouranian Theory, or On Some Singular Relations Between the Earth and the Sky (1862). His book Miranda. A Book Divided Into Three Parts, Entitled Souls, Numbers, Stars, on the Neo-Christian Religion, London, 1858, was listed by Augustus De Morgan in his A Budget of Paradoxes.

References

External links
Cenni SISM

1812 births
1894 deaths
People from the Province of Bologna
19th-century Italian mathematicians
Italian politicians